Julien Gibert (born 15 June 1976 in Lunel-Viel) is a French professional football player. Currently, he plays in the Championnat National for Étoile Fréjus Saint-Raphaël.

He played on the professional level in Ligue 2 for ES Wasquehal. A goalkeeper, Gibert was captain of FC Martigues playing squad during 2008.

References

1976 births
Living people
French footballers
Ligue 2 players
FC Martigues players
ÉFC Fréjus Saint-Raphaël players
Association football goalkeepers
Wasquehal Football players